William S. "Billy" Renn Jr. (born May 31, 1928) is a former American football coach.  He was the 23rd head football coach at The Apprentice School in Newport News, Virginia and he held that position for two seasons, from 1967 until 1968. His coaching record at Apprentice was 5–8–2.

References

1928 births
Living people
The Apprentice Builders football coaches
Elon University alumni